Kellie Jo Archer (born 1969) is a biostatistician specializing in microarray analysis techniques. She is a professor of biostatistics and chair of the biostatistics department at the Ohio State University.

Education and career
Archer graduated summa cum laude from Franklin College in 1991. 
After earning a master's degree at the Ohio State University in 1993, she worked for several years as a medical data analyst before completing her Ph.D. at the Ohio State University College of Public Health in 2001. Her dissertation, Goodness-of-Fit for Logistic Regression Models Developed Using Data Collected from a Complex Sampling Design, was supervised by Stanley Lemeshow.

She became an assistant professor at Virginia Commonwealth University in 2002, earning tenure there in 2009, becoming director of the VCU  Massey  Cancer  Center  Biostatistics  Shared Resource in 2011, and being promoted to full professor in 2015. She moved to Ohio State in 2016, and continues to hold an affiliate position at Virginia Commonwealth University.

Recognition
Archer was named a Fellow of the American Statistical Association in 2021. She was elected chair of the ASA Statistical Learning and Data Science section in 2021.

References

External links

1969 births
Living people
American statisticians
Women statisticians
Franklin College (Indiana) alumni
Virginia Commonwealth University faculty
Ohio State University faculty
Fellows of the American Statistical Association
Ohio State University Graduate School alumni